André Caetano Gonçalves (born 23 January 1992) is a Swiss-Portuguese professional footballer currently playing for FC Linth 04.

Club career
Gonçalves began his playing career with lower league clubs FC Glarus and FC Rapperswil-Jona before moving on to Swiss Super League club FC Zürich in 2006. After spending time with the club's youth teams, from late 2009 he started playing regularly with the reserve team. Gonçalves then went on loan to Swiss Challenge League club FC Aarau for both the 2010–11 and 2011–12 seasons in order to gain more playing experience. He returned to Zürich for the 2012–13 season. In May 2013 it was announced that he joined second tier side Schaffhausen.

Ahead of the 2019/20 season, Gonçalves joined FC Linth 04.

International career
Gonçalves is a Switzerland youth international. In 2009, he was part of the Swiss under-17 team that won the 2009 FIFA U-17 World Cup beating host nation Nigeria 1—0 in the final. Gonçalves featured in all 7 matches at the tournament and scored in the team's round of 16 win against Germany.

Honours
FIFA U-17 World Cup: 2009

References

External links
 
 

1992 births
Living people
People from Interlaken-Oberhasli District
Swiss people of Portuguese descent
Swiss men's footballers
Switzerland youth international footballers
Association football defenders
FC Zürich players
FC Aarau players
FC Schaffhausen players
Swiss Super League players
Swiss Challenge League players
Sportspeople from the canton of Bern